The Science Park of Metz is located in the South-East of the city, in the area of Grigy. It is the second technology center of Lorraine in terms of workforce, behind the science park of Nancy. There are more than 250 companies and 4000 people working in the park.

History

The park was created in 1983 by the former mayor of the city, Jean-Marie Rausch.
The first name given to the park was "Technopôle Metz 2000". Then, it was renamed "Metz Technopôle" in 2002.

Facilities

Transportation 

The place being really close to Luxembourg, Germany and Belgium and having good transportation hubs, it is perfect for big events.

Since 2013, the bus rapid transit network, the METTIS, links the Science Park with the center of Metz.

Buildings 
Important international facilities exist in the park :

Metz International Congress Center
World Trade Center
Business center CESCOM

Education

Many graduate schools are located in the park, especially engineering ones :
 Arts et Métiers ParisTech (ENSAM), engineering school in mechanical and industrial engineering
 École supérieure d’électricité (Supélec)
 Georgia Tech Lorraine, European campus of the Georgia Institute of Technology
 ESITC
 ENIM

The overall number of students, including the university of Lorraine and the high schools, is about 4500.

Parks and recreation

The 18-hole golf course of Metz is in the middle of the Science Park. Many other green places are well maintained, especially around the lake Symphony and the lake Ariane.

References

Metz
Science parks in France